Maria Zoéga  (—7 July 1940), was a Swedish businessperson.

She managed Zoéga Coffee, a successful firm in Helsingborg, from 1886. A brand of coffee, the Maria Zoéga, is named after her.

References

1860 births
1940 deaths
19th-century Swedish businesswomen
19th-century Swedish businesspeople
20th-century Swedish businesswomen
20th-century Swedish businesspeople